Richard Kinard Sanders (born August 23, 1940) is a retired American actor and screenwriter. He played quirky news anchorman Les Nessman on the CBS sitcom WKRP in Cincinnati (1978–1982).

Early life and education

Sanders was born in Harrisburg, Pennsylvania, the son of Thelma S. and Henry Irvine Sanders. After graduating from Leavenworth High School in Leavenworth, Kansas, he was enrolled in the Fine Arts Department at Carnegie Institute of Technology (now known as Carnegie Mellon University) as an acting major. There, he was a classmate of René Auberjonois and Aubrey Wilson, among others.

Career 
After graduating from college, Sanders studied Shakespearean theatre in England on a Fulbright Scholarship, and served a stint with the Peace Corps in the states of Paraiba and Rio Grande do Norte, Brazil.

Sanders joined Gordon Jump and Frank Bonner in reprising his original WKRP role on The New WKRP in Cincinnati in the early 1990s. He has guest-appeared on other television shows, including Lou Grant, Kojak, The Rockford Files, Alice, Newhart, Murder, She Wrote, Designing Women, and Married... with Children, and has also acted in the mini-series Roots: The Next Generations, the animated series Inhumanoids, the horror film Lovers Lane,  and the Robert De Niro/Cuba Gooding Jr. film Men of Honor.

Besides being an actor, Sanders is a screenwriter, having written, among other works, several episodes of WKRP in Cincinnati. In 1993, he starred in the computer game Day of the Tentacle as the voice of Bernard Bernoulli.

Personal life 
Sanders resides in Woodinville, Washington.
He is married to Marilynn Marko-Sanders.

Filmography

Film

Television

References

External links

1940 births
Living people
American male film actors
American male television actors
American male voice actors
Actors from Harrisburg, Pennsylvania
Male actors from Pennsylvania
20th-century American male actors
21st-century American male actors
Carnegie Mellon University College of Fine Arts alumni
Peace Corps volunteers